Kompienga is a department or commune of Kompienga Province in Burkina Faso.

Cities 
The department consists of 17 villages:

 Bossoari
 Bounou
 Diabiga
 Diamanga
 Fanwargou
 Kpankpaga
 Kompienga, chef-lieu
 Kpinkankanti
 Nabamboula
 Nakiantanga
 Ogagou
 Pimpébougou
 Pognoa-Sankoado
 Pognoa-Tikonti
 Tambibangou
 Toukoudouga
 Toutourgou.

References 

Departments of Burkina Faso
Kompienga Province